The Night of Hate Comments, also called The Night of Vicious Comments or Reply Night, was a South Korean variety program on JTBC2 which first aired on June 21, 2019. Through the sixteenth episode, the show's inaugural four hosts, Shin Dong-yup, Kim Sook, Kim Jong-min and Sulli welcomed celebrity guest(s) each week to discuss their reactions to hateful comments, malicious rumors, and cyberbullying they had encountered online. JTBC called it a new show "to help the stars become stronger psychologically". The show also brings up proper internet manners and etiquette. The program was discontinued following Sulli's death.

Background
The show's producing director is Lee Na-ra who produced another JTBC variety show, LAN Cable Life. Along with three hosts in their 40s, it was the first long-term hosting role for 25-year-old Sulli and her return to TV work after a number of years.

The show's format includes celebrity guests reading and discussing their own social media comments, and was noted to resemble Jimmy Kimmel's Celebrities Read Mean Tweets by Kang Hae-ryun in The Washington Post. On the first episode there were no guests and the four hosts set the show's tone, responding to comments about themselves, sometimes acknowledging agreement or disagreement.

On October 14, 2019, the cast and producers recorded another episode, per a Monday scheduling, unaware of the death of co-host Sulli, which was reported later in the day. Trailers and an upcoming episode were immediately cancelled, followed by an October 21 announcement that the show would not continue.

Reception
Upon co-host Sulli's death, some viewers said that the show should be abolished due to the mental anguish it appeared to cause the celebrities as they read and discussed the hateful comments directed at them, and questioned whether such comments might have affected Sulli's psychological state prior to her death. But, others said they felt Sulli participated on the show to fight the culture of cyberbullying and admired her for it; and appreciated the show's efforts.

Episode list

References

External links
 

2019 South Korean television series debuts
South Korean variety television shows
South Korean television talk shows
JTBC original programming
Korean-language television shows
2019 South Korean television series endings
Works about cyberbullying